The Leutkirch Pulverturm or Leutkirch Powder Tower was built towards the end of the 17th century on the southeast corner of Leutkirch im Allgäu,  Baden-Württemberg, Germany, as part of the rebuilding of the collapsed town wall.
The tower was used to store gunpowder, was sold by the town in 1804 and, since 1918, has been in municipal ownership again. It is listed as a cultural monument by the town of Leutkirch.

References

External links 

 Denkmalliste der Stadt Leutkirch im Allgäu, as at December 2004 (pdf; 366 KB)

Round towers
17th-century architecture
Leutkirch im Allgäu
Fortified towers in Germany
Buildings and structures in Ravensburg (district)